Barry Wagner (born November 24, 1967) is a retired American football player in the Arena Football League for the Orlando Predators, with whom he won his first ArenaBowl Championship, and the San Jose SaberCats, with whom he won two championships. He also played in the World Indoor Football League as a wide receiver/defensive back with the Daytona Beach Thunder. Wagner is the all-time AFL all-purpose yardage leader. He is considered the best Arena Football player of all time. During the 2012 Arena Football League season, Wagner was named the league's greatest player of all time.

Early life
Wagner attended Greensboro Public School in Greensboro, Alabama where he was a member of the football team. Wagner served as a wide receiver and the backup quarterback.

College career
While attending Alabama A&M University, Wagner starred in football and broke many school records held by former Pittsburgh Steeler John Stallworth. As a senior, he caught 112 passes for 1,817 yards (16.22 yards per rec. avg.), won Associated Press and Football News Division II All-America honors, was the Southern Intercollegiate Athletic Conference Player of the Year, and played in the 1989 Senior Bowl. In one game against Clark Atlanta University, he caught 23 passes, setting two school single game records with 370 receiving yards and 5 receiving touchdowns.

Professional career

Arena Football
During his initial tenure with the Orlando Predators, Wagner was a key component in the famous "Miracle Minute", in which he scored two touchdowns, two two-point conversions, recovered an onside kick, and made a key defensive stop, all in the final minute of a 1992 game against the Detroit Drive. He was a 7-time AFL Ironman of the Year award winner, 7 years in a row (1992–1997) He was traded to the New Jersey Red Dogs for Alvin Ashley on September 23, 1999 after requesting a trade. However, soon after the trade, the league and its players agreed to a new collective bargaining agreement that resulted in several veteran players — including Wagner — gaining free agency. Wagner then signed with the San Jose SaberCats.

Wagner played for the Sabercats from 2000 to 2006, and won the ArenaBowl with San Jose in 2002 and 2004.

During the AFL's 20th season in 2006, the league named Wagner the league's second greatest player of all time behind Eddie Brown.

On Wednesday, March 28, 2007 after being cut from the Tampa Bay Storm's practice squad, he joined the Daytona Beach Thunder of the WIFL. However, after the Thunder ended their season at 4-10, he rejoined the Predators for the 2007 AFL playoffs. On June, Friday 13th, 2008 during halftime at the Week 16 game vs. New Orleans VooDoo, Barry Wagner officially retired from the AFL.

Wagner finished his career with 991 receptions for 13,363 yards and 265 touchdowns. From 1993 to 1999, Wagner posted seven consecutive 1,000 yard receiving seasons. He had 855 rushing yards for 127 touchdowns. On special teams, Wagner posted 6,279 return yards and nine touchdowns, with four of them coming in 1999. Defensively, Wagner finished his career with 677 tackles, 28 forced fumbles, recovering 14, with 47 interceptions and five defensive scores.

He is the AFL's all-time leader in rushing touchdowns with 127, until it was broken by Derrick Ross on June 6, 2014.

As of the 2011 AFL season, he ranks third in league history in receptions, second in receiving yards behind Damian Harrell, fourth in receiving touchdowns. Wagner is tied for second in all-time tackles and fourth in interceptions.

NFL career
Wagner was originally signed by the New England Blitz of the Professional Spring Football League in 1992. He was signed as a free agent by the Chicago Bears in 1992 and spent the entire season on the active roster playing on special teams. He earned a contract from the Indianapolis Colts and was on the practice squad for the entire 1994 season.

Notes

External links
 Profile at ArenaFan Online

1967 births
Living people
People from Greensboro, Alabama
American football wide receivers
Alabama A&M Bulldogs football players
Orlando Predators players
Chicago Bears players
San Jose SaberCats players
Tampa Bay Storm players
Indianapolis Colts players
New Jersey Red Dogs players
World Indoor Football League (2007)